The Open 13 is an annual men's tennis tournament played in Marseille, France.  The tournament is an ATP Tour 250 series event on the Association of Tennis Professionals tour. It is held for one week in February. The number 13 is the INSEE code of the Bouches-du-Rhône département of which Marseille is the capital. 

The tournament is played on indoor hard courts at the Palais des sports de Marseille. The Centre Court has a capacity of 5,800 seats.

The tournament is one of four French events of the ATP Tour 250 series, along with the Open Sud de France, the Moselle Open and the Lyon Open.

History
The event was first held in 1993. It was the project of ex-professional tennis player and native of Marseille Jean-François Caujolle, who remains tournament director to this day.

The Swiss player Marc Rosset won the singles title at the first two editions of the event in 1993 and 1994. He also won it for a 3rd time in 2000. Rosset, Thomas Enqvist and Jo-Wilfried Tsonga hold the record for most titles with 3 each.

Roger Federer played his first ATP singles final at this tournament in 2000, losing to Marc Rosset. Their match was the first all-Swiss final of an ATP event. Federer went on to win the title in 2003.

Other notable winners include former world No. 1 ranked players and Grand Slam champions Boris Becker, Yevgeny Kafelnikov, Andy Murray and Juan Martin del Potro. French players have won the most titles at this event, 9 in singles and 11 in doubles.

Past finals

Singles

Doubles finals

References

External links

 
 ATP tournament profile

 
Tennis tournaments in France
Indoor tennis tournaments
Hard court tennis tournaments
Recurring events established in 1993